Mogam Muppadhu Varusham is a 1976 Indian Tamil-language film directed by S. P. Muthuraman and written by Mahendran. The film stars Kamal Haasan, Vijayakumar, Sumithra, Fatafat Jayalaxmi and Sripriya. It is based on the novel of the same name, written by Maniyan and serialised in the magazine Ananda Vikatan. The film was released on 27 November 1976, and became a commercial success.

Plot 

Ramesh, a city bred man is married to Kasthuri, a village girl. On the other hand, Ravishankar, a village lad and Menaka, a modern woman are married. Menaka hates living with Ravishankar as he does not show interest in sex life. Meanwhile, Bhama, a young girl wants at least to have a child with Ramesh, and is attracted by him even if he does not marry her. The film ends with these people overcoming all their issues and living happily, except Bhama, who commits suicide.

Cast 
 Kamal Haasan as Ramesh
 Vijayakumar as Ravishankar
 Major Sundarrajan
 Sumithra as Kasthuri
 Sukumari as Kamala
 Fatafat Jayalaxmi as Menaka
 Sripriya as Bama
 Manorama as Raji
 Kathadi Ramamurthy as Shankaran
 Peeli Sivam as Vimala's Husband
 S. N. Lakshmi as  Kasthuri's Mami
 S. R. Veeraraghavan  as Krishnamurthy

Production 
Mogam Muppadhu Varusham is based on the novel of the same name, written by Maniyan and serialised in the magazine Ananda Vikatan. This film was produced under production banner Swarnambika Productions and shot in black-and-white. It was given an "A" (adults only) certificate by the Central Board of Film Certification with no cuts.

Soundtrack 
The music was composed by Vijaya Bhaskar.

Release and reception 
Mogam Muppadhu Varusham was released on 27 November 1976, and became a commercial success. Kanthan of Kalki appreciated the director for properly adapting the source material to the screen, and the dialogues.

References

Bibliography

External links 
 

1970s Tamil-language films
1976 films
Films based on Indian novels
Films directed by S. P. Muthuraman
Films scored by Vijaya Bhaskar
Films with screenplays by Mahendran (filmmaker)
Indian black-and-white films